Christina Kubisch (born 31 January 1948) is a German composer, sound artist, performance artist, professor and flautist. She composes both electronic and acoustic music for multimedia installations. She gained recognition in the mid-1970s from her early works including concerts, performances and installations. Her work focuses on synthesising audio and visual arts to create multi-sensory experiences for participants. She focuses on finding sounds and music in unusual places that participants would normally not think of as somewhere to experience sound.

Early life and education
Kubisch was born in Bremen, Germany in 1948. She studied painting at the Academy of Fine Arts in Stuttgart, Germany from 1967 to 1968. She studied flute, piano and composition at the Academy of Music in Hamburg, Germany and the Jazz Academy of Graz, Austria from 1969 to 1972. From 1972 to 1974, she continued studying music at the Conservatory of Zurich. In 1974 she moved to Milan, Italy where she began studying composition and electronic music at the conservatory of Milan. She graduated with a diploma in 1976.

Career
Kubisch began performing in 1974. She held concerts in Europe and the United States, and during the period from 1974 to 1980 she began performing with Italian artist Fabrizio Plessi to create video concerts and installations. She created her first sound installations and sound sculptures in 1980 and began working in electroacoustic composition. Her works during this time included Two and Two (1977), a live, multimedia performance and Tempo Liquido (1979), a minimalist piece.

From 1980 to 1981, Kubisch began studying electronics at the Technical Institute of Milan and began working with electromagnetic induction. She began creating sound installations as a way to move out of the concert hall space. Her 1981 work Il Respiro del Mare began her sound engineering career, for which she developed an electromagnetic sound induction system.

In 1982, Kubisch participated in the Venice Biennale. In 1986 she began working with a new medium, ultraviolet light, and in 1987 she moved to Berlin. During that time, she created the pieces On Air (1984) and Iter Magneticum (1986) and "Night Flight" (1987). In 1988, Kubisch received the Award of the German Industrial Association and took on a residency grant at the Barkenhoff in Worpswede, Germany. In 1989 she became a lecturer at the Jan van Eyck Academy in Maastricht, Germany and in 1990 she received a projects grant from Kunstfonds e.V., Bonn. From 1990 to 1991, Kubisch began creating her first works with solar energy. She also served as a guest lecturer at the Academy of Fine Arts in Münster, Germany and received a working grant from the Senator for Cultural Affairs, Berlin. She received another studio grant from the Senator in 1994. After 1991 and until 1994 she served as a guest professor at the Academy of Fine Arts in Berlin. In 1992 she was given an international residency project by the Queen Elizabeth II Arts Council of New Zealand. From 1994 to 1995, Kubisch served as a guest professor at the École nationale supérieure des Beaux-Arts, Paris. Kubisch's 1994 installation Sechs Spiegel is one of her better known pieces, and the sound was recorded and released as a CD. The piece used the architectural proportions of the German building the Ludgwigskirche to determine the rates of repetitions and pauses in vibrating drinking glasses. In 1994, Kubisch was employed as professor of sculpture and media art at the Academy of Fine Arts in Saarbrücken, Germany, and she continued to serve in that position until 2013. In 1996, Kubisch began The Clocktower Project in Massachusetts, a project in which she reactivated a clocktower that had long been out of commission. She created and recorded sounds for the project by ringing, striking, hammering and brushing the bells of the clock with different objects. In 1997, she was made a member of the Akademie der Künste in Berlin.

Since 1999, Kubisch has received a number of awards, grants and accolades for her work. In 2000, Kubisch was the feature of a 20-year retrospective solo exhibition in Russelsheim. In 2003, Kubisch began her Electrical Walks projects, which would become some of her most famous works. The walks are a sort of guided tour through a city, where participants are given special headphones, designed by Kubisch, and directed to parts of the city that have interesting soundscapes. She created personal walks that she did not open to the public in Germany, England, France, Ireland, Japan, Latvia, Sweden, Switzerland, Slovakia, Spain, Taiwan, and the United States. She has held public walks in Berlin, Cologne, Karlsruhe, Bremen, Oxford, London and New York. In 2009 and 2010, Kubisch participated in two separate residency programmes, the first in Copenhagen with the DIVA (Danish International Visiting Artists) Exchange Program and the second in Douala, Cameroon at Doual'art. In 2013, Kubisch received a grant from the Beethoven Foundation for Arts and Culture. She currently lives in Hoppegarten near Berlin.

Selected discography

 "Two and Two" LP, with Fabrizio Plessi, Multhipla Records, 1976
 "Tempo Liquido" LP, with Fabrizio Plessi, Cramps Records, 1979
 "Mag Magazin 6" MC, with Fabrizio Plessi, Modern Art Gallery, 1980
 "On Air" MC, Melania Productions, 1984 
 "Iter Magneticum" MC, Edition Giannozzo Berlin, 1986 
 "Night Flights" LP, ADN, 1987 
 "Sechs Spiegel" CD, Edition RZ, 1995 
 "Dreaming Of A Major Third (A Composition For The Clocktower Of Mass MoCA)" CD, Edition RZ, 1998 
 "Vier Stücke [Four Pieces]" CD, Edition RZ, 2000
 "Le Jardin Magnétique" CD-R, Cité de la Musique, 2001  
 "Diapason" CD, Semishigure, 2002
 "Twelve Signals" CD, Semishigure, 2004
 "Armonica" CD, Semishigure, 2005
 "Licht Himmel" CD, Gasometer Oberhausen, 2006 
 "E-legend" CD, Ikon Gallery, 2006
 "Five Electrical Walks" CD, Important Records, 2007
 "Minimal Disinformation" Lathe Cut 7", AA Records, 2007 
 "La Ville Magnétique / The Magnetic City" CD, Ville De Poitiers, 2008
 "Magnetic Flights" CD, Important Records, 2011
 "Mono Fluido" CD Important Records, 2011
 "Dichte Wolken" CD Edition Museum Ostwall, 2012
 "Mosaïque Mosaic" CD, with Eckehard Güther, Gruenrekorder, 2013
 "Schall und Klang" CD, Fragment Factory, 2019

Other notable works
 Emergency Solos composition for flute with gloves
 Il Respiro Del Mare, 1981
 Conference of Trees
 Sechs Spiegel, 1994
 The Clocktower Project
 Dinner Music

Awards, recognitions and grants
Kubisch has received awards and grants, among others the German Industrial Association award (1988), composition grant of the city of Berlin (2000), Honorary German Sound Art award (2008), Ars Electronica Honorary Mention Digital music (2008), Saarländischer Rundfunk Media Art award (2009) and she has been invited for residencies from the Banff Centre for the Arts, (Canada), Djerassi Resident Artist Program (California, US), IASPIS (Stockholm, Sweden), DIVA, Danish International Visiting Artists program (Copenhagen) and from the art centre Doual'art (Doualla, Cameroun).

Bibliography
 Pensa, Iolanda (Ed.) 2017. Public Art in Africa. Art et transformations urbaines à Douala /// Art and Urban Transformations in Douala. Genève: Metis Presses.

References

External links
 http://www.christinakubisch.de

1948 births
20th-century classical composers
20th-century German composers
Women classical composers
German classical composers
German women classical composers
German music educators
German sound artists
Women sound artists
Living people
Members of the Academy of Arts, Berlin
Musicians from Bremen
Women in electronic music
Women music educators
20th-century women composers
20th-century German women